Findlay is an unincorporated community in Dooly County, in the U.S. state of Georgia.

History
A post office called Findlay was established in 1889, and remained in operation until 1905. The community was named after one Mr. Findlay, the proprietor of a local sawmill.

References

Unincorporated communities in Dooly County, Georgia
Unincorporated communities in Georgia (U.S. state)